Edward Joseph Pfeffer (March 4, 1888 – August 15, 1972) born in Seymour, Illinois, was a pitcher for the St. Louis Browns (1911), Brooklyn Dodgers/Robins (1913–1921), St. Louis Cardinals (1921–1924) and Pittsburgh Pirates (1924). His older brother Francis was known as Big Jeff Pfeffer.

He helped the Robins win the 1916 and 1920 National League pennants. In the 1916 World Series, he recorded a save in Game 3 and was the hard-luck losing pitcher of the series-ending Game 5.

Pfeffer led the National League in hit batsmen in 1916 (17) and 1917 (16). In 1916 he gave up Rogers Hornsby's first home run. In 13 seasons he had a 158–112 win–loss record with 10 saves in 347 games.

As of the end of the 2014 season, Pfeffer ranked 96th on the MLB career ERA list (2.77) and tied for 73rd on the MLB career hit batsmen list (105). He is the Dodgers' career leader in ERA (2.31).

He died in Chicago at the age of 84, and is interred at Rock Island National Cemetery.

See also
 Top 100 Major League Baseball hit batsmen leaders

Notes

Sources

1888 births
1972 deaths
St. Louis Browns players
Brooklyn Robins players
Brooklyn Dodgers players
St. Louis Cardinals players
Pittsburgh Pirates players
Baseball players from Illinois
Major League Baseball pitchers
La Crosse Outcats players
Fort Wayne Billikens players
Denver Grizzlies players
Grand Rapids Black Sox players
Grand Rapids Bill-eds players
San Francisco Seals (baseball) players
Toledo Mud Hens players